Wazouba may refer to:

Wazouba, Mali, a village in the commune of Kassa, Mali, in the Cercle of Koro in the Mopti Region of Mali, inhabited by Dogon People
Wazouba (dialect), one of the Dogon languages